The 44th Infantry Division (44-ya Pekhotnaya Diviziya) was an infantry formation of the Russian Imperial Army.

Organization
1st Brigade
173rd Infantry Regiment
174th Infantry Regiment
2nd Brigade
175th Infantry Regiment
176th Perevolochensky Infantry Regiment
44th Artillery Brigade

Commanders
August-November 1915: Anthony Veselovsky

References

Infantry divisions of the Russian Empire
Military units and formations disestablished in 1918